Frode is a Norwegian masculine given name. It is also used as a surname. People with the name include:

Given name

A–H
 Frode Alfheim (born 1967), Norwegian trade unionist
 Frode Alnæs (born 1959), Norwegian musician
 Frode Andresen (born 1973), Norwegian biathlete 
 Frode Barth (born 1968), Norwegian musician
 Frode Berg (born 1971), Norwegian musician
 Frode Berge (born 1966), Norwegian politician
 Frode Birkeland (born 1972), Norwegian football player and coach
 Frode Bjerkholt (1894–1974), Norwegian football player
 Frode Alfson Bjørdal (born 1960), Norwegian academic
 Frode Bovim (born 1977), Norwegian sailor
 Frode Elsness (born 1973), Norwegian chess player 
 Frode Estil (born 1972), Norwegian cross-country skier
 Frode Fjellheim (born 1959), Norwegian yoiker and musician
 Frode Gjerstad (born 1948), Norwegian musician
 Frode Glesnes (born 1974), Norwegian musician
 Frode Granhus (1965–2017), Norwegian author
 Frode Grodås (born 1964), Norwegian football player and coach
 Frode Grytten (born 1960), Norwegian writer and journalist
 Frode Hagen (born 1974), Norwegian handball player
 Frode Haltli (born 1975), Norwegian accordion player
 Frode Hansen, multiple people
 Frode Håre (born 1972), Norwegian ski jumper
 Frode Helgerud (born 1950), Norwegian businessperson and politician

J–Z
 Frode Jacobsen (born 1974), Norwegian musician
 Frode Jacobsen (politician) (born 1968), Norwegian politician
 Frode Jakobsen (1906–1997), Danish writer and politician 
 Frode Johnsen (born 1974), Norwegian football player 
 Frode Kippe (born 1978), Norwegian football player  
 Frode Kirkebjerg (1888–1975), Danish equestrian
 Frode Kjekstad (born 1974), Norwegian musician
 Frode Kyvåg (born 1945), Norwegian handball coach and sports official
 Frode Lafton (born 1976), Norwegian football player
 Frode Lillefjell (born 1968), Norwegian cross-country skier and coach
 Frode Løberg (born 23 January 1963), Norwegian biathlete
 Frode Moen (born 1969), Norwegian Nordic combined skier.
 Frode Nilsen (1923–2016), Norwegian diplomat 
 Frode Nymo (born 1975), Norwegian musician
 Frode Olsen (born 1967), Norwegian football player
 Frode Onarheim (1900–1985), Norwegian military officer and businessperson
 Frode Øverli (born 1968), Norwegian cartoonist
 Frode Rinnan (1905–1997), Norwegian architect and politician
 Frode Saugestad (born 1974), Norwegian literary scholar
 Frode Scheie (born 1967), Norwegian handball player and coach
 Frode Søby (born 1935), Danish chess player
 Frode Sørensen, multiple people
 Frode Syvertsen (born 1963), Norwegian speed skater
 Frode Thingnæs (1940–2012), Norwegian musician
 Frode Thomassen (born 1967), Norwegian football player
 Frode Urkedal (born 1993), Norwegian chess player

Middle name
 Hein Frode Hansen (born 1972), Norwegian musician
 Jan Frode Andersen (born 1972), Norwegian tennis player
 Leif Frode Onarheim (1934–2021), Norwegian businessperson and politician
 Stig Frode Henriksen (born 1975), Norwegian actor

Surname
 Cecilia Frode (born 1970), Swedish actress 
 Lukas Fröde (born 1995), German football player

Danish masculine given names
Norwegian masculine given names